The Conroy Turbo-Three was a series of two Douglas DC-3s modified with turboprop engines by Conroy Aircraft. The first conversion first flew on May 13, 1969. Two Rolls-Royce Dart Mk. 510 engines from a crashed Vickers Viscount previously operated by United Airlines were used to replace the original Pratt & Whitney radial engines. Because the new turboprops were much lighter than the radial engines, they had to be mounted further forward to maintain the aircraft's center of gravity. The replacement engines increased the aircraft's cruising speed from 170 mph to 215 mph. The prototype was later converted into the Conroy Tri-Turbo-Three.

The second conversion was called the Super Turbo-Three because it was converted from a surplus Super DC-3. Unlike the first conversion, the Dart engines were mounted in the rear part of the engine nacelle. Due to the small diameter of the Viscount propellers, airflow was restricted by the bulky nacelles and landing gear fairings. This caused the takeoff distance to be 6000 feet, making it unappealing as a commuter aircraft. The aircraft ended up parked at Groton-New London Airport in Groton, Connecticut where on February 19, 1984 its cockpit was hit by a wing from a Trans American Lockheed L-100 Hercules.

A similar conversion had been performed for British European Airways (BEA) in the 1940s when a Dakota was converted to Dart power in order to obtain turboprop experience prior to the introduction of the Viscount.

See also

References

1960s United States airliners
Turbo Three
Low-wing aircraft
Douglas DC-3
Aircraft first flown in 1969
Twin-turboprop tractor aircraft